Michaelston-super-Ely (meaning: llan church + Mihangel Saint Michael + Elai River Ely) is a village, to the west of the city of Cardiff, Wales.

It is approximately half a mile from the boundary with the Vale of Glamorgan.  To the north lies the village of St Fagans, and to the east the Ely estate. The community of Michaelston-super-Ely was joined with St Fagans in 1968.

The historic St Michael's Church was decommissioned in 2010. It is a Grade II* listed building dating from the late 12th or early 13th-century.

References

External links 
GENUKI(tm) page

Villages in Cardiff